National Secondary Route 135, or just Route 135 (or ) is a National Road Route of Costa Rica, located in the Alajuela province.

Description
In Alajuela province the route covers San Ramón canton (San Ramón, San Rafael, San Isidro districts), Atenas canton (Atenas, Mercedes, San José, Santa Eulalia districts), Palmares canton (Palmares, Zaragoza, Buenos Aires, Candelaria, La Granja districts).

References

Highways in Costa Rica